People, Places, Pieces is a 3-CD live album by English musician Hugh Cornwell, released through Invisible Hands Music in October 2006. It was recorded at the London Carling Academy over three nights between 12 and 14 April 2005. Containing 45 tracks, the set spans the whole of Cornwell's career and includes tracks from his time with the Stranglers and from the majority of his solo albums. It was available by mail-order only, and accompanied by a 12-track "highlights" CD entitled Dirty Dozen, which was available in stores.

"Live It and Breathe It" (track 14 on disc 3) was played live for a number of years before Cornwell finally recorded a studio version of the song for his 2015 compilation album The Fall and Rise of Hugh Cornwell.

Background
When asked in 2006 why he had released the live album, Cornwell said, "I have not had a live recording out for some time. ... I have been playing in a trio now with Winston McGilvray who plays drums and Steve Lawrence who is the bassist for a good five years now. We have played together for so long without any changes in the line-up that I thought that that in itself was a good reason for making a recording." When Cornwell and his band had three consecutive nights at the London Carling Academy at the end of a tour, they decided to do the live recording there. Cornwell: "We could get three completely different sets recorded and, as I have played with those guys for so many years, we were able to expand on the number of song titles and to add on a lot more songs from both the Stranglers catalogue and my own catalogue than those we already had been playing on the other dates of the tour."

Talking about why People, Places, Pieces was only being made available through mail order, whereas Dirty Dozen was available in record shops, Cornwell explained, "It is very difficult to get a shop chain to stock a triple live album, but we were able to get a single one in."

Track listing

Dirty Dozen track listing

Personnel
Credits adapted from the album liner notes.

Musicians
Hugh Cornwell – lead vocals, electric and acoustic guitar
Steve Lawrence – bass, backing vocals, lead vocals on "Something Better Change"
Windsor McGilvray – drums, percussion, backing vocals, lead vocals on "Irate Caterpillar"
Technical
Chris Goulstone – engineer, mixing, mastering
Hugh Cornwell – box design concept, sleeve concept (Dirty Dozen) 
John Clube – design
Anthony Robins – front cover photograph (Dirty Dozen)
Julian Lowry – back cover image (Dirty Dozen)
Keith Curtis – photographs (Dirty Dozen)

References

Hugh Cornwell albums
2006 live albums